Jason Phillips is the name of:

Jason Phillips (catcher) (born 1976), MLB catcher
Jason Phillips (pitcher) (born 1974), MLB pitcher
Jason Phillips (linebacker) (born 1986), American football linebacker
Jason Phillips (wide receiver) (born 1966), American football wide receiver
Jadakiss (born Jason Phillips in 1975), rapper